"" (May God be gracious to us, or more literally: May God want to be merciful to us) is a Lutheran hymn, with words written by Martin Luther based on the Psalm 67. The hymn in three stanzas of nine lines each was first published in Wittenberg in 1524. Its best known hymn tune, Zahn No. 7247, was published in Strasbourg in 1524. Heinrich Schütz and Johann Sebastian Bach wrote settings of the hymn. It was translated to English and has appeared in dozens of hymnals.

History 
Luther wrote in a letter to Georg Spalatin, around the end of 1523, about the importance of writing "Deutsche Psalmen" (German psalms). Trying to win Spalatin for collaboration, he specifies:

It was first printed in Wittenberg in 1524, first in a leaflet together with "Aus tiefer Not schrei ich zu dir”, a paraphrase of Psalm 130. It appeared then in Luther's Ein weyse Christliche Messe zu halten und zum Tisch Gottis zu gehen (A way to hold a Christian mass and to go to the table of God). It was published the same year in the Erfurt Enchiridion.

Lyrics

Melody and settings 
Johann Walter's "Es woll uns Gott genädig sein" hymn tune, Zahn No. 7246, originally composed for another hymn, was published in 1524. That hymn tune, however, was from 1543 associated with the "Christ unser Herr zum Jordan kam" hymn. Another tune for the "Es woll uns Gott genädig sein" hymn, Zahn No. 7247, was published in 1524 in Strasbourg.

Heinrich Schütz set it as part of his Becker Psalter of all psalms in German. Johann Sebastian Bach used it as the basis for chorale preludes, and in cantatas such as his second cantata as Thomaskantor in Leipzig, Die Himmel erzählen die Ehre Gottes, BWV 76, when he closed part I with the first stanza and part II with the last.

Translation 
The hymn was translated to English and has appeared in over 25 hymnals. A. T. Russell translated it as "May God unto us gracious be" and included it in his Psalms & Hymns, printed in 1851. Richard Massie translated it in 1851 to "May God bestow on us His grace".

Notes

References

Bibliography

External links 
 
 BWV 76.7=76.14 bach-chorales.com

16th-century hymns in German
Lutheran hymns based on Psalms
Hymns by Martin Luther
1524 works